A. J. DeMedio (March 25, 1916 – May 15, 1997) was a Democratic member of the Pennsylvania House of Representatives and an attorney. He was elected in 1966 and served a total of 8 consecutive terms before retiring in 1982.

DeMedio was a World War II veteran, serving in the United States Army from 1942 to 1946.

References

Democratic Party members of the Pennsylvania House of Representatives
1997 deaths
1916 births
20th-century American politicians
American military personnel of World War II